José Luis Alguacil (born August 9, 1972) is a Venezuelan professional baseball coach and a former infielder and manager. He served as first base coach of the San Francisco Giants of Major League Baseball (MLB) for three seasons, after being named to the post on November 7, 2016.

Biography
A native of Caracas, he played minor league baseball in the Giants' and Chicago White Sox' organizations, as well as in the independent leagues, from 1993 to 2001. He batted .245 in 808 professional games. He batted left-handed and threw right-handed.

Alguacil began his managing career in the Short Season New York–Penn League with the 2004 Vermont Expos, spending three years with the club.  In 2007, he rejoined the Giants as a roving minor league infield instructor, and worked for eight years (through 2014) in that post before returning to managing. He played a role in the development of fellow Venezuelan Pablo Sandoval as Sandoval rose through the Giants' system.

He then piloted the Richmond Flying Squirrels in 2015 and Sacramento River Cats in 2016, compiling a record of 141–143 (.490).

References

External links
, or Pelota Binaria (Venezuelan Winter League)

1972 births
Living people
Arizona League Giants players
Bakersfield Blaze players
Baseball infielders
Birmingham Barons players
Burlington Bees players
Canton Crocodiles players
Cardenales de Lara players
Charlotte Knights players
Clinton LumberKings players
Everett Giants players
Leones del Caracas players
Major League Baseball first base coaches
Minor league baseball managers
Newark Bears players
San Francisco Giants coaches
San Jose Giants players
Shreveport Captains players
Sonoma County Crushers players
Baseball players from Caracas
Venezuelan baseball players
Winston-Salem Warthogs players